Brian Keith (born Robert Alba Keith, November 14, 1921 – June 24, 1997) was an American film, television, and stage actor who in his six-decade career gained recognition for his work in films such as the Disney family film The Parent Trap (1961); Johnny Shiloh (1963); the comedy The Russians Are Coming, the Russians Are Coming (1966); and the adventure saga The Wind and the Lion (1975), in which he portrayed President Theodore Roosevelt.

On television, two of his best-known roles were those of bachelor-uncle-turned-reluctant-parent Bill Davis in the 1960s sitcom Family Affair, and a tough retired judge in the 1980s lighthearted crime drama Hardcastle and McCormick.  He also starred in The Brian Keith Show, which aired on NBC from 1972 to 1974, where he portrayed a pediatrician who operated a free clinic on Oahu, and in the CBS comedy series Heartland.

Early life
Robert Alba Keith was born in Bayonne, New Jersey, on November 14, 1921, to actor Robert Keith and stage actress Helena Shipman, a native of Aberdeen, Washington.  Some sources also list his full name as Brian Robert Keith. He was Roman Catholic. In 1941 he graduated from East Rockaway High School in East Rockaway, New York. 

He joined the United States Marine Corps in 1942 completing his service in 1945. He served during World War II as a radioman/tail gunner in the rear cockpit of a two-man Douglas SBD Dauntless dive bomber in a U.S. Marine squadron. He was awarded a Combat Aircrew Insignia, Air Medal, Asiatic–Pacific Campaign Medal with three battle stars and World War II Victory Medal.

Career

Theatre
Keith made his Broadway debut in 1948 in the ensemble of Mister Roberts, which starred his father as "Doc". He was a guard in Darkness at Noon (1951) by Sidney Kingsley, and was in Out West of Eighth (1951), which had only a short run.

Television and films
Keith began to guest star on shows such as Hands of Mystery, Shadow of the Cloak, and an adaptation of Twenty Thousand Leagues Under the Sea in Tales of Tomorrow. He was in Police Story, Suspense, Eye Witness, The United States Steel Hour, Robert Montgomery Presents, and The Motorola Television Hour. Keith's feature film debut was in a Western for Paramount, Arrowhead (1953). He stayed at that studio for Alaska Seas (1954), replacing Van Heflin, and Jivaro (1954). 

Keith guest starred on Campbell Summer Soundstage, The Pepsi-Cola Playhouse, Lux Video Theatre, and The Mask and also played Mike Hammer in a television pilot directed by Blake Edwards, but the series was not picked up.

He went to Columbia for The Bamboo Prison (1954), The Violent Men (1955), Tight Spot (1955), and 5 Against the House (1955), the last two directed by Phil Karlson. He was meant to support Joan Crawford in Queen Bee, but did not appear in the final film.

He guest starred on The Elgin Hour, Mystery Is My Business, Jane Wyman Presents The Fireside Theatre, The Box Brothers, The Ford Television Theatre, Climax!, Wire Service and Studio 57. 

In 1955, Keith starred in his own series, Crusader, as fictional journalist Matt Anders. He continued to appear in films for Columbia, such as Storm Center (1956) co-starring with Bette Davis and Nightfall (1956) with Aldo Ray.

In June 1956, he announced he had formed his own company, Michael Productions, and had optioned a story by Robert Blees called Cairo.

Film stardom
Keith was second billed in Dino (1957) with Sal Mineo, and Run of the Arrow (1957) with Rod Steiger. He was top billed in Chicago Confidential (1957), but returned to supporting parts with Appointment with a Shadow (1957) Hell Canyon Outlaws (1957), and Fort Dobbs (1958).  He announced he would make Alien Virus for his Michael Productions, but it was not made. Keith was top billed in some low-budget action movies: Violent Road (1958), Desert Hell (1958), Sierra Baron (1958), and Villa!! (1958). The last two were shot back-to-back in Mexico. He guest starred on Studio One in Hollywood, Rawhide, Laramie, Alfred Hitchcock Presents, and an episode of Zane Grey Theater, which was written and directed by Sam Peckinpah and later led to The Westerner.

The Westerner and Disney
Keith supported Paul Newman in The Young Philadelphians (1959), and had the lead in two productions for Disney, the TV show Elfego Baca: Move Along, Mustangers (1959) and the feature Ten Who Dared (1960). In 1960, he won acclaim for his starring role in Sam Peckinpah's extremely hard-bitten, adult, and short-lived series The Westerner (1960). It went for only 13 episodes, but became a cult classic. "Only four or five of those were any good", said Keith later. "But those four or five were as good as anything anybody has ever done." Keith guest starred in: The Untouchables, The Americans, Frontier Circus, Alcoa Premiere, Outlaws, Follow the Sun, and Alfred Hitchcock Presents again. Keith made a second film for Disney, playing the father of twins in the film The Parent Trap (1961), costarring Hayley Mills and Maureen O'Hara, which was a huge hit.  Critical acclaim was given to The Deadly Companions (1961), a Western with O'Hara, which marked Peckinpah's feature directorial debut. Keith did two more films for Disney, Moon Pilot (1962) and Savage Sam (1963). 

He guest starred on: Target: The Corruptors, The Alfred Hitchcock Hour, The Virginian (1963), Sam Benedict, Dr. Kildare, The Fugitive, Wagon Train, 77 Sunset Strip, Kraft Suspense Theatre, The Great Adventure, Profiles in Courage. Keith did a Western for Universal, The Raiders (1963) then returned to Disney for Johnny Shiloh (1963), Bristle Face (1964), The Tenderfoot (1964), A Tiger Walks (1964) and Those Calloways (1965).

He went to Fox for The Pleasure Seekers (1964) and had support roles in The Hallelujah Trail (1965), The Rare Breed (1966) (again with O'Hara), and Nevada Smith (1966), co-starring with Steve McQueen as traveling gunsmith Jonas Cord. Keith did the comedies The Russians Are Coming! The Russians Are Coming! (1966) for Norman Jewison, Way... Way Out (1966) with Jerry Lewis, and With Six You Get Eggroll (1968) with Doris Day.

Family Affair

In 1966, Keith landed the role of Uncle Bill Davis on CBS's popular television situation comedy Family Affair.  This role earned him three Emmy Award nominations for Best Actor in a Comedy Series. The show made him a household name. It was in the vein of such successful 1960s and 1970s sitcoms that dealt with widowhood and/or many single-parent issues as: The Andy Griffith Show, My Three Sons, The Beverly Hillbillies, Petticoat Junction, One Day at a Time, Here's Lucy, Julia, The Courtship of Eddie's Father, The Brady Bunch, The Partridge Family, and Sanford and Son. During its first season in 1966, Family Affair was an immediate hit, ranking number 15 in the Nielsen ratings.  By the end of its fifth season, in 1971, Family Affair still had high ratings, but was cancelled after 138 episodes.

Kathy Garver, who co-starred as Keith's teenaged niece, Cissy, on Family Affair, indicated that Keith said: "I'm a cultural Irishman, don't you know, I'm a cultural Irishman."  Garver explained: "But he went through many manifestations and changes of character, during the five years that we shot. At first, he was up and then his second year, he was going through a divorce, and then, the third year, he met somebody else, and he became more anecdotal and told stories that he loved kids, and he was very outspoken about those that he did not like. So, he was a very interesting character and it was Brian and Sebastian Cabot [who played Mr. French] had such a different style of acting and that's another reason I think that Family Affair was so popular and stayed as it did. Both excellent actors, both coming from very different methods and styles of acting with Sebastian was more from the classical style and he would take home his script and he would dutifully look at every single word and have it to perfection, and then Brian would come in and say, 'Oh what do we have today? Let me see the scene, uh-huh, uh-huh, let's go!' So he was very improvisational, motion of the moment. And those two different styles really worked out each other, very well."

During the series' run Keith appeared in Reflections in a Golden Eye (1967) with Marlon Brando, With Six You Get Eggroll (1968) with Doris Day, Krakatoa: East of Java (1968) for Cinerama, and Gaily, Gaily (1969) for Norman Jewison. He had leading roles in Suppose They Gave a War and Nobody Came? (1970) for Cinemrama and The McKenzie Break (1970). In 1970, Keith moved to Hawaii. Keith made Scandalous John (1971) for Disney, Something Big (1972) with Dean Martin and director Andrew McLaglen, and the TV movie Second Chance (1972).

The Brian Keith Show, The Zoo Gang, Archer
Keith went on to star as pediatrician Dr. Sean Jamison in the NBC sitcom The Brian Keith Show (also known as The Little People). The series was cancelled in 1974 after two seasons. "The show ended because it was bad, not because of Hawaii", said Keith.

Keith also starred in the role of Steven "The Fox" Halliday in the six-part television miniseries, The Zoo Gang (1974), about a group of former underground French Resistance fighters from World War II. The show also starred Sir John Mills, Lilli Palmer, and Barry Morse, and featured a theme by Paul McCartney. Keith was third billed in The Yakuza (1974) starring Robert Mitchum, and in The Wind and the Lion (1975) starring Sean Connery, Keith played President Theodore Roosevelt for writer-director John Milius. He starred in the TV series Archer (1975) as Lew Archer, replacing Peter Graves who'd starred in the pilot, but it was cancelled after six episodes and has never been rerun in the United States (Jerry Goldsmith's score for the first episode of the series was released in 2018 by Lalaland Records). Keith did some Westerns, The Quest (1976) pilot, and Joe Panther (1976), and the TV movie The Loneliest Runner (1976). He had a supporting role in Nickelodeon (1976) and did the TV movies In the Matter of Karen Ann Quinlan (1977) and The Court-Martial of George Armstrong Custer (1977). He was in How the West Was Won (1978), Hooper (1978) with Burt Reynolds, Centennial (1979), and The Chisholms (1979). In 1992, he starred in the unsold, ABC half-hour pilot The Streets of Beverly Hills. 

Keith spoke fluent Russian, which led to his casting as a Russian in two roles, as a Soviet scientist in the film Meteor (1979) with Natalie Wood (who also spoke fluent Russian and played his translator), and as the Soviet premier in the NBC miniseries World War III (1982)  with Rock Hudson. He replaced Barnard Hughes on Broadway in Da and was on The Seekers (1979), Power (1980), The Silent Lovers (1980), The Mountain Men (1980) with Charlton Heston, and Charlie Chan and the Curse of the Dragon Queen (1981). Of the latter he joked " "I only did the picture because it had a long title, and I seem to specialize in those". He had support roles in Sharky's Machine (1981) with Burt Reynolds and Cry for the Strangers (1982).

Hardcastle and McCormick, Pursuit of Happiness, and Heartland
Keith once again returned to series television in 1983, with Hardcastle and McCormick, in the role of a cranky retired judge named Milton C. Hardcastle. Daniel Hugh Kelly co-starred as ex-con Mark McCormick in this ABC crime drama with elements of comedy. The chemistry of Keith and Kelly was a hit, and the series lasted three years until its cancellation in 1986. During the series run, Keith was in Murder, She Wrote and The B.R.A.T. Patrol (1986). Keith starred in The Alamo: Thirteen Days to Glory (1987) (as Davy Crockett), and Death Before Dishonor, then did another TV series Pursuit of Happiness (1987–88), which ran 10 episodes. He was in After the Rain (1988), Young Guns (1988), and Perry Mason: The Case of the Lethal Lesson (1989). He starred in another short-lived series Heartland (1989). He had roles in Welcome Home (1989), and Lady in the Corner (1989).

Later career
Keith made a guest appearance in the Evening Shade, season-one episode "Chip Off The Old Brick" (1991), as the loud-mouthed father of Herman Stiles (played by actor Michael Jeter). He reprised his character from The Westerner in The Gambler Returns: The Luck of the Draw (1991) (which featured numerous actors from 1950s TV series playing their original roles in brief cameos), had the lead in Walter & Emily (1991), a short-lived sitcom, and The Streets of Beverly Hills (1992), a pilot. Brian Keith appeared on a two-part episode of Major Dad, season four "The People's Choice" as the Major's (Gerald McRaney) domineering father who pays a visit to the family. The episode aired on September 25, 1992. Keith performed the role of Mullibok on the Star Trek: Deep Space Nine season-one episode entitled "Progress" (1993), in which an elderly farmer resists forcible relocation by Bajoran authorities. 

Among his last performances were The Secrets of Lake Success, Wind Dancer, The Commish, Under a Killing Moon (1994), The Return of Hunter: Everyone Walks in L.A.  (1995), The Monroes, Favorite Deadly Sins (1995), Entertaining Angels: The Dorothy Day Story (1996), Walker, Texas Ranger, Touched by an Angel, and The Second Civil War (1997). Keith guest starred in an episode of the TV series The Marshal titled "The Bounty Hunter" (1995) in which he played then Wichita, Kansas, Police Chief Rick Stone under the stage name of Chief Skoblow. The Wichita Police Department cooperated with the Canadian TV production company by providing details of Chief Stone's actual police dress uniform for Keith to wear during the episode. Keith also provided the voice of Ben Parker on Spider-Man: The Animated Series.

In his last film, Keith played President William McKinley in the film Rough Riders (1997). Director John Milius dedicated the film to "Brian Keith, Actor, Marine, Raconteur."

Personal life
Keith married three times, first to Frances Helm; then, in 1954, to actress Judy Landon (who made a guest appearance on Family Affair); and finally, in 1970, to Hawaiian actress Victoria Young (née Leialoha), who later appeared on The Brian Keith Show as Nurse Puni.

Keith had two children with Landon, and together, they adopted three children. Keith also had two children with Young.

Death
On June 24, 1997, at the age of 75, Keith died of a self-inflicted gunshot wound at his home in Malibu, California. He suffered from emphysema and lung cancer during the latter part of his life, despite having quit smoking ten years earlier. He reportedly also struggled with financial problems, and suffered from depression throughout his final days. Keith's death occurred two months after the death of his daughter Daisy, who also died by suicide.

Maureen O'Hara stated in an interview not long after Keith died that she believed he did not commit suicide. She stated that he had a large gun collection, and enjoyed cleaning them and showing them to people. She believed he might have been cleaning the gun or looking at it when it went off, and that his death was an accident and definitely not a suicide. She had just visited him and said he was in good spirits. She also stated that he would not have committed suicide given his Catholic beliefs. 

Keith's family was joined by many mourners at a private funeral, including Family Affair co-stars Kathy Garver and Johnny Whitaker, and Hardcastle and McCormick co-star Daniel Hugh Kelly. Keith's ashes were interred next to those of his daughter Daisy at Westwood Village Memorial Park Cemetery in Los Angeles.

Legacy
On June 26, 2008, Brian Keith received a star on the Hollywood Walk of Fame.

Work

Film

 Pied Piper Malone (1924) as Little Boy
 The Other Kind of Love (1924) as Child (uncredited)
 Knute Rockne, All American (1940) as Student at Train Station (uncredited)
 Portrait of Jennie (1948) as Ice-Skating Extra (uncredited)
 Fourteen Hours (1951) as Extra (uncredited)
 Arrowhead (1953) as Capt. Bill North
 Alaska Seas (1954) as Jim Kimmerly
 Jivaro (1954) as Tony
 The Bamboo Prison (1954) as Cpl. Brady
 The Violent Men (1955) as Cole Wilkison
 Tight Spot (1955) as Vince Striker
 5 Against the House (1955) as Brick
 Storm Center (1956) as Paul Duncan
 Nightfall (1956) as John
 Run of the Arrow (1957) as Capt. Clark
 Dino (1957) as Larry Sheridan
 Chicago Confidential (1957) as Dist. Atty. Jim Fremont
 Appointment with a Shadow (1957) as Lt. Spencer
 Hell Canyon Outlaws (1957) as Happy Waters
 Fort Dobbs (1958) as Clett
 Violent Road (1958) as Mitch Barton
 Desert Hell (1958) as Capt. Robert Edwards
 Sierra Baron (1958) as Jack McCracken
 Villa!! (1958) as Bill Harmon
 The Young Philadelphians (1959) as Mike Flanagan
 Ten Who Dared (1960) as William 'Bill' Dunn
 The Deadly Companions (1961) as Yellowleg
 The Parent Trap (1961) as Mitch Evers
 Moon Pilot (1962) as Maj. Gen. John M. Vanneman
 Savage Sam (1963) as Uncle Beck Coates
 The Raiders (1963) as John G. McElroy / Narrator
 A Tiger Walks (1964) as Sheriff Pete Williams
 The Pleasure Seekers (1964) as Paul Barton
 Those Calloways (1965) as Cam Calloway
 The Hallelujah Trail (1965) as Frank Wallingham
 The Rare Breed (1966) as Bowen
 Nevada Smith (1966) as Jonas Cord
 The Russians Are Coming, the Russians Are Coming (1966) as Police Chief Link Mattocks
 Way...Way Out (1966) as Gen. 'Howling Bull' Hallenby
 Reflections in a Golden Eye (1967) as Lt. Col. Morris Langdon
 With Six You Get Eggroll (1968) as Jake Iverson
 Krakatoa, East of Java (1969) as Connerly
 Gaily, Gaily (1969) as Francis Sullivan
 Suppose They Gave a War and Nobody Came? (1970) as Officer Michael M. Nace
 The McKenzie Break (1970) as Capt. Jack Connor
 Scandalous John (1971) as John McCanless
 Something Big (1971) as Col. Morgan
 The Yakuza (1975) as George Tanner
 The Wind and the Lion (1975) as President Theodore Roosevelt
 Joe Panther (1976) as Capt. Harper
 Nickelodeon (1976) as H.H. Cobb
 Hooper (1978) as Jocko
 Meteor (1979) as Dr. Dubov
 The Mountain Men (1980) as Henry Frapp
 Charlie Chan and the Curse of the Dragon Queen (1981) as Police Chief
 Sharky's Machine (1981) as Papa
 Death Before Dishonor (1987) as Col. Halloran
 Young Guns (1988) as Buckshot Roberts
 After the Rain (1988)
 Lady in a Corner (1989) as David Henderson
 Welcome Home (1989) as Harry Robins
 Wind Dancer (1993) as Truman Richards
 Entertaining Angels: The Dorothy Day Story (1996) as Cardinal
 The Second Civil War (1997) as Maj. Gen. Charles Buford
 Walking Thunder (1997) as Narrator (voice)
 Rough Riders (1997) as President William McKinley  
 Follow Your Heart (1999) as Roddy Thompson (final film role)

Television

 Suspense (CBS, "Set-Up for Death" (1949), starring John Marley & Brian Keith) 
 Police Story (CBS, guest star)
 Tales Of Tomorrow: Appointment On Mars (1952) Television Series (as Robert Keith, Jr.)
 Target: The Corruptors! (ABC, guest star)
 Sam Benedict (NBC, guest star)
 Crusader (CBS, 1955–56; 52 episodes in title role) as Matt Anders
 The Westerner (NBC, 1960) as Dave Blassingame
 Alfred Hitchcock Presents (Cell 227) 1960
 Outlaws (NBC, 1961–62; 2 episodes as guest star) as Sven Johannsen / Jim Whipple
 The Untouchables ("The Jamaica Ginger Story") (1961) as Jim Martinson
 Alfred Hitchcock Hour: "Night of the Owl" (CBS, 1962) as Vernon Wedge / Herbert Morrison / Dave Rainey / Arnold Shawn
 The Virginian ("Duel at Shiloh") (1963) as Johnny Wade
 Wagon Train (1963, 2 episodes as guest star) as First Sgt. Gault / Tom Tuesday
 Fear in a Desert City (Pilot for The Fugitive) (1963) as Edward Welles
 Kraft Suspense Theatre: "A Cause of Anger" S1/Ep 19 (NBC, 1964) as Andy Bastian
 The Tenderfoot (1964), a three-part television miniseries comedy Western for Walt Disney's Wonderful World of Color 
 Family Affair (CBS, 1966–71) as Uncle Bill Davis
 Password (CBS, 1966) as Himself, Game Show Contestant / Celebrity Guest Star
 The Bull of the West (TV movie, 1972) as Johnny Wade (archive footage)
 The Brian Keith Show (NBC, 1972–74) as Dr. Sean Jamison
 The Zoo Gang (ITV, 1974) as Steven 'The Fox' Halliday
 Archer (NBC, six episodes, 1975) as Lew Archer
 The Loneliest Runner (NBC, 1976) as Arnold Curtis
 In the Matter of Karen Ann Quinlan (TV movie, 1977) as Joe Quinlan
 How the West Was Won (originally titled The Macahans) (ABC, 1977) as General Stonecipher
 Centennial (NBC, 1978–79) as Sheriff Axel Dumire
 The Seekers  (1979) as Elijah Weatherby
 The Chisholms (CBS, 1979) as Andrew Blake
 World War III (miniseries) as Soviet General Secretary Gorny
 Cry for the Strangers (TV movie, 1982) as Chief Whalen
 Hardcastle and McCormick (ABC, 1983–86) as Judge Milton C. Hardcastle
 The Murder of Sherlock Holmes (Pilot for Murder, She Wrote) (CBS, 1984) as Caleb McCallum
 The B.R.A.T. Patrol (Disney Made for TV movie ABC, 1986)
 Pursuit of Happiness (ABC, 1987) as Prof. Roland G. Duncan
 Perry Mason: The Case of the Lethal Lesson (CBS, 1989) as Frank Wellman Sr.
 Heartland (CBS, 1989) as B.L. McCutcheon
 The Young Riders: "Star Light, Star Bright" (ABC, 1991) as Cyrus Happy
 Walter & Emily (NBC, 1991–92) as Walter Collins
 Evening Shade: "Chip Off the Old Brick" (CBS, 1991–94)
 The Streets of Beverly Hills (pilot) ABC (1992)
 Major Dad: "The People's Choice; parts I & II" (season 4, episodes 1 & 2) (CBS, 1992) as Jake MacGillis
 Star Trek: Deep Space Nine: "Progress" (syndicated, 1993) as Mullibok
 Spider-Man (1995) as Uncle Ben (voice)
 The Commish: "The Iceman Cometh" (ABC, 1994) as Phil 'Iceman' Greene / Lou Parslow
 Cybill: "Who's Who for What's His Name?" (season 2, episode 16)  (CBS, 1996) as Arthur Minnow
 Pacific Blue: "First Shoot" (season 1, episode 2) (USA, 1996) as Mac McNamara
 Touched by an Angel (CBS, 1996) as Leonard Pound
 Walker, Texas Ranger: "Ghost Rider" (season 5, episode 3)  (CBS, 1996) as Del Forman
 Duckman: "Kidney, Popsicle, and Nuts" (season 4, episode 18) (USA, 1997) as Duckman's Father (voice)

Stage
Heyday (1946)
Mr. Roberts as First Mate (c. 1950 as Robert Keith, Jr.) N.B. Robert Keith, Sr. was the Doctor in it.
 Darkness at Noon (1951)
 Da (1978)

Video Games
 Under a Killing Moon (1994) as The Colonel

References

External links

 
 
 
 

 

1921 births
1997 deaths
20th-century American male actors
Male actors from New Jersey
American male child actors
American male film actors
United States Marine Corps personnel of World War II
American male silent film actors
American male stage actors
American male television actors
American television directors
Burials at Westwood Village Memorial Park Cemetery
Recipients of the Air Medal
Suicides by firearm in California
Actors from Bayonne, New Jersey
People from East Rockaway, New York
Military personnel from New Jersey
Western (genre) television actors
Catholics from New Jersey
1997 suicides
East Rockaway High School alumni